Grey District is a district in the West Coast Region of New Zealand that covers Greymouth, Runanga, Blackball, Cobden, and settlements along the Grey River. The seat of the Grey District Council, the local government authority that administers the district, is at Greymouth, where % of the district's population live.

The Grey District is on the West Coast of the South Island. It stretches from the south banks of the Punakaiki River in the north, southeast to Mt Anderson, north to The Pinacle, southeast to Craigeburn, in a southeast direction to Mt Barron, southwest to Jacksons and following the Taramakau River to the Tasman Sea.

The district is rich in history and character. Key industries are tourism, mining, agriculture, fishing, manufacturing and services industries. The main hospital for the West Coast is in Greymouth.

Demographics

Grey District had a population of 13,344 at the 2018 New Zealand census, a decrease of 27 people (−0.2%) since the 2013 census, and an increase of 123 people (0.9%) since the 2006 census. There were 5,361 households. There were 6,771 males and 6,573 females, giving a sex ratio of 1.03 males per female. The median age was 43.9 years (compared with 37.4 years nationally), with 2,565 people (19.2%) aged under 15 years, 2,244 (16.8%) aged 15 to 29, 6,093 (45.7%) aged 30 to 64, and 2,445 (18.3%) aged 65 or older.

Ethnicities were 92.2% European/Pākehā, 10.2% Māori, 1.3% Pacific peoples, 2.9% Asian, and 2.0% other ethnicities. People may identify with more than one ethnicity.

The percentage of people born overseas was 10.1, compared with 27.1% nationally.

Although some people objected to giving their religion, 51.7% had no religion, 36.9% were Christian, 0.5% were Hindu, 0.2% were Muslim, 0.2% were Buddhist and 2.0% had other religions.

Of those at least 15 years old, 1,137 (10.5%) people had a bachelor or higher degree, and 2,970 (27.6%) people had no formal qualifications. The median income was $27,700, compared with $31,800 nationally. 1,329 people (12.3%) earned over $70,000 compared to 17.2% nationally. The employment status of those at least 15 was that 5,295 (49.1%) people were employed full-time, 1,665 (15.4%) were part-time, and 372 (3.5%) were unemployed.

History 

The first buildings at the Grey River mouth were constructed by Ngati Wairangi Maori at Cobden. European settlement followed the discovery of coal and gold.

Greymouth, the district’s largest centre, lies beside the Tasman Sea and the Grey River. Greymouth experienced a rapid change in the cultural makeup of the region, reflecting an influx of migrants drawn to the gold rush, mining and related business opportunities.

As Greymouth developed, it became vulnerable to flooding. After two major floods in 1988, the Greymouth flood wall project was undertaken. Completed in 1990, the flood wall provides security for the town, and has allowed commerce to develop further.

A Māori settlement at Māwhera pā was long established on the south bank of the Māwheranui river. When the first European explorers, Thomas Brunner and Charles Heaphy, arrived in 1846, they stayed at the pā, and were given food. Two years later Brunner travelled up the river, which he renamed after Governor George Grey.

James Mackay negotiated with local Māori chiefs for purchase of the West Coast region by the government, and the agreement was signed at Māwhera pā on 21 May 1860. One of the few Māori reserves was the land around the pā, now forming the main business district in Greymouth, and most of this still remains in Māori ownership.

Infrastructure 

There are 619 km of road in the district, of which 358 km are sealed (2000s data).

References

External links

 Grey District Council
 http://www.greydistrict.co.nz/